Pir Shah Shamsuddin Sabzwari Multani (died 1276 C.E) was a Muslim Shia missionary and Pir (Shia) from Sabzawar in present-day Afghanistan. Shamsuddin Sabzwari arrived in Multan in early 1200C.E. in modern Pakistan, established a dargah and preached Islam to the local population. Shamsuddin Sabzwari is considered to be a saint due to his poetry and the local traditions. Shamsuddin Sabzwari died in 1276 and his mausoleum is located in Multan. The Urs of Shamsuddin Sabzwari takes place June of each year.
In South Asia, by the propagation of Islam commenced after the demise of Mohammad and Sindh was first to receive Islam. At about the same time, the followers and well wishers of Muhammad's family had started preaching and conversion on behalf of Ali and his successive Imams. The sixth Imam, lsmail bin Imam Jafar-as-Sadiq, and the succeeding Ismaili Imams sent out Da'is (Missionaries) to the far corners of the then known world (Seerat-al-Mustaqim or Sat Panth in Indian language).

Shams Sabzwari too occupies a prominent position amongst the famous Ismaili 'Da'is. He was sent by the twenty-ninth Ismaili Imam, Kassim Shah, to preach the Ismaili Nizari faith in South Asia.

Pir Shams conducted his missionary activities all over the North-western and Western parts of South Asia and in the context of Vedic scripture vis-a-vis Al-Quran, revived the idea of the necessity of a living guide in the minds of his non-Muslim audiences, bringing thousands of them to the fold of Ismaili Islam.

It is given in the Noor-a-Mubin that Pir Shams was born at Sabzwar in Iran where he spent his childhood and adolescence in pursuit of education. Probably, in his twenties he spent working under the tutelage of his father, Pir Salahuddin, in Sabzwari and perhaps in his early thirties succeeded his father and was assigned the Da'wa of Badakshan and Northern India. Conducting his missionary work with great ardour and zeal, his activities ranged from Badakshan, through Kashmir, and from Punjab, Sindh to Gujerat with Multan as his headquarters. As he spent the better part of his later years at or around Multan he was laid to rest there, hence he is also famous as Pir Shams Sabzwari Multani.

Mausoleum and Urs

The Mausoleum of Shamsuddin Sabzwari Multani ibn Pir Sayed Salahuddin is located about half a mile to the east of the Fort site, on the high bank of the old bed of the Ravi River near Aam-Khas Garden was born in 1200. He died in 1278 and the shrine was built by his grandson in 1330. The tomb is square,  in height surmounted by a hemispherical dome. It is decorated with ornamental glazed tiles.

Compositions 
In the closing lines of one of his Punjabi compositions, Pīr Shams emphasizes that his ginān is addressed to the world of spirits. He advises his listeners to fight and overcome their constantly changing minds so their spirits can be enlightened by his teachings. Failure to understand the deeper meaning of the gināns will cause the ‘entire life of that heedless one [to be] lost’.

See also
 Mausoleums of Multan

References

Sufism in Pakistan
Indian Sufi saints
Year of birth missing
1276 deaths
Tourist attractions in Multan
Ziyarat
Multan District
Pakistani Ismailis
Punjabi Sufis
People from Multan